The Ecorse River is an  river in southern Michigan.  Because of its small size, it is often identified as Ecorse Creek.  It flows through the Downriver section of Metro Detroit, and is a tributary of the Detroit River.  The early French settlers named it the Rivière aux Écorces ("bark river"). They named the river after the custom they observed of the local Native American tribe, who wrapped their dead in birch or elm bark, and buried them at the mouth of the river. The river has two branches, which meet at Council Point Park in the city of Lincoln Park, where chief Pontiac held a council in 1763 before attacking Fort Detroit.

Description
The river system consists of a  South Branch ( when including the Sexton-Kilfoil Drain) and a  North Branch, which combine and run another  to the Detroit River. The north branch drains  and has tributaries designated the Trouton Drain, Freeman Drain, Black Creek, and the Douglas and Kelly Drain. The La Blanc Drain drains .

The north branch flows through Romulus, Dearborn Heights, Allen Park, along a small portion of the southern border of Melvindale, Lincoln Park and then along the border of Lincoln Park and Ecorse. The south branch flows through Romulus, Taylor, Allen Park and Lincoln Park. It is joined by the Sexton and Kilfoil Drain in Taylor.  After the two branches join in Lincoln Park, the river flows along the boundary between Ecorse and Wyandotte to its mouth on the Detroit River. A marina occupies both banks of the river at its mouth.

The river has a very low gradient and is subject to heavy silting which worsens the seasonal flooding. Homes near the river are required to carry flood insurance, and damaging flooding is a common occurrence.

The Ecorse River flows into the Detroit River about midway along that river's course. The next river north of the Ecorse is the Rouge River, while the next river south is the Huron River.

The watershed is heavily developed, with a population density of 3,711 people per square mile in 2000. It is also heavily industrialized with both light and heavy industry. Contamination is a problem, both from ongoing industrial and residential sources and as a legacy of the steel works along its lower length.

Flood control
It was reported in September 2008 that the Wayne County Department of Environment will begin the first phase of a $239 million project to protect the nine municipalities along the north branch of the creek from flash flooding.  The first phase, to begin in early 2009, is to cost $7 to $10 million and will be funded by special assessments on the 48,000 properties in the watershed.  It will consist of changes to the 80 paths that cross the creek, as well as constructing new drains and basins.

Note
Some sources designate the North and South branches as Ecorse Creek and the only short combined stream as Ecorse River.

As of April 14, 2009, a high amount of E. coli bacteria from human waste was found to be in the creek water. Officials were urging citizens to stay out and away from the water.

See also
List of rivers of Michigan

References

External links
Ecorse Creek Watershed Inter-Municipality Committee
Water quality report from Environmental Quality
Ecorse Creek Flood Control

Detroit River
Rivers of Wayne County, Michigan
Rivers of Michigan